Sallachy is a hamlet on the north shore of Loch Long in the district of Skye and Lochalsh in the Scottish Highlands and is in the council area of Highland.

References

Populated places in Lochalsh
Populated places in Ross and Cromarty